Robert R. Bertrand (February 12, 1906 – May 4, 2002) was an American sound engineer. In 1974, he was nominated for an Academy Award in the category Best Sound for the film The Sting.

Bertrand worked in the film industry for some 40 years prior to his retirement in the mid-1970s. He served as the sound engineer for the TV series, Marcus Welby, M.D. for three years, and "for many other top productions".

Selected filmography
 The Sting (1973; co-nominated with Ronald K. Pierce)

References

External links

1906 births
2002 deaths
American audio engineers
People from Wildomar, California
Engineers from California
20th-century American engineers